Geoff Denial (31 January 1932 – 24 March 2020) was an English former footballer who played for Sheffield United, Oxford United and Rugby Town. During his spell at Oxford, he played 199 games in all competitions. He was called up during the Suez Crisis before he made his debut for Oxford United.

References

External links
Rage Online profile

1932 births
2020 deaths
English footballers
Association football defenders
Rugby Town F.C. (1945) players
Oxford United F.C. players
Sheffield United F.C. players
English Football League players
Footballers from Sheffield
People from Stocksbridge